Gluek may refer to:

Places
United States
Gluek, Minnesota, unincorporated community
Gluek Brewery in Minneapolis, Minnesota
Grace Gluek, an art reviewer for The New York Times
Gluek Park, a park in Minneapolis, Minnesota
Gluek House and Carriage House, a house on the National Register of Historic Places in Minneapolis, Minnesota

See also
 Glück